Perry–Foley Airport  is a public-use airport located  south of the central business district of the city of Perry in Taylor County, Florida, United States. The airport is publicly owned.

History 
During World War II, the airfield was constructed and used by the Third Air Force of the United States Army Air Forces for training.

Perry AAF was a replacement training unit, hosting the 312th and  441st Fighter Squadrons.   Pilots received their final training in P-40 Warhawks, P-47 Thunderbolts, and P-51 Mustangs at Perry AAF prior to joining operational units in the European or Pacific theaters.

With the close of hostilities, the last military pilots left Perry AAF in September 1945. The airfield was subsequently deeded to Taylor County by the War Assets Administration in April 1947, and the field reverted to civilian aviation purposes.  It has been used as a general aviation airfield ever since.

See also

 Florida World War II Army Airfields

References

 Maurer, Maurer (ed.). Combat Squadrons of the Air Force: World War II. Maxwell Air Force Base, Alabama: Office of Air Force History, 1982 .
 Maurer, Maurer (ed.), Air Force Combat Units of World War II, History and Insignia, USAF Historical Division, Washington, DC, 1961 (reprint 1983) 
 Shaw, Frederick J. (2004), Locating Air Force Base Sites History's Legacy, Air Force History and Museums Program, United States Air Force, Washington DC, 2004.
 World War II airfields database: Florida
 AFJRA Search Perry Army Airfield

External links

1943 establishments in Florida
Airports established in 1943
Airports in Florida
Transportation buildings and structures in Taylor County, Florida
Airfields of the United States Army Air Forces in Florida